Piotr Pawłowski (19 August 1925 – 27 February 2012) was a Polish actor. He appeared in 45 films and television shows between 1958 and 1995.

Selected filmography
 Kwiecień (1961)
 Pharaoh (1966)

References

External links

1925 births
2012 deaths
Polish male film actors
People from Września County
Polish male stage actors
Polish male television actors
Polish theatre directors
Burials at Powązki Cemetery